Pandanus hornei ("Vakwa Parasol") is a species of plant in the family Pandanaceae, one of several Pandanus species that are endemic to the Seychelles.

Description
This species is a tall (15 meters), erect tree. It has a single, tall, straight trunk, with a spreading, parasol-like canopy only near the top. Its branches usually divide into groups of three. 

Its stilt-roots are characteristically large but very closely packed.

Distribution and habitat
Pandanus hornei is endemic to the Seychelles, and was formerly common on all of the granitic islands. In valleys and on wetter slopes it was a dominant part of the original forests. 
It is currently threatened by habitat loss and invasive alien species such as Paraserianthes falcataria.

References

Trees of Seychelles
hornei
Vulnerable plants
Endemic flora of Seychelles
Taxonomy articles created by Polbot
Taxobox binomials not recognized by IUCN